Harper Stadium is a 9,000-seat indoor arena located in Fort Smith, Arkansas.  It is essentially a covered, open-air arena used for rodeos, auto racing, concerts (between 7,000 and 10,000), and other events.

Harper Stadium is part of Kay Rodgers Park, site of the annual Arkansas Oklahoma State Fair.

External links
Harper Stadium

Indoor arenas in Arkansas
Sports venues in Arkansas